Ana Sanat Pasargad Futsal Club is an Iranian professional futsal club based in Qom.

History 

The club was founded in 2013 as Atoliyeh Tehran. In recent years, due to the change of sponsor, has had different names such as Ana Beton, Sohan Mohammad Sima, Ferdows and Ana Sanat Pasargad.

Crest

Season to season
The table below chronicles the achievements of the Club in various competitions.

Last updated: 29 October 2022

Notes:
* unofficial titles
1 worst title in history of club

Key

P   = Played
W   = Games won
D   = Games drawn
L   = Games lost

GF  = Goals for
GA  = Goals against
Pts = Points
Pos = Final position

Honours 

 Iran Futsal's 1st Division
 Runners-up (1): 2016–17

Players

Current squad

Notable players

Club captains

Personnel

Current technical staff

Last updated: 22 January 2023

Managers

Last updated: 17 December 2022

Club officials

Last updated: 17 December 2022

Club statistics and records

Statistics in super league
 Seasons in Iranian Futsal Super League: 5
 Best position in Iranian Futsal Super League: 4th (2018–19)
 Worst position in Iranian Futsal Super League: 10th (2021–22)
 Most goals scored in a season: 81 (2019–20)
 Most goals scored in a match:
Ana Sanat 7 - 5 Ahoora
Ana Sanat 7 - 2 Shahin
Ana Sanat 7 - 2 Shahrvand
 Most goals conceded in a match:
Ana Sanat 2 - 9 Giti Pasand
 Top scorer: Ruhollah Isari with 75 goals

General statistics
 All-time most goals scored in a match:
Ana Sanat 8 - 3 Shahrdari Neka
Ana Sanat 8 - 1 Shahed Shiraz

Top goalscorers

References 

Futsal clubs in Iran
Sport in Qom
2013 establishments in Iran
Futsal clubs established in 2013